The Wutars were an English five piece rock band from High Wycombe, England. Their final line up consisted of Alex Gold, Maz Manzini, Alex Kew, Alex Valentine and Sam Hayward before the band split in 2011.

Their first record EP1 was released in July 2009 on the band's own label Very Decent Music. The second was the acoustic-driven EP2. The band supported such acts as The Divine Comedy (band), The King Blues, Master Shortie, Hayseed Dixie, Towers Of London, Glen Matlock, Spizzenergi and Pugwash.

History
The Wutars formed in 2005 whilst studying at Buckinghamshire New University. The original line-up was Alex Gold (vocals, guitar), Sam Hayward (drums), Maz Manzini (vocals, bass) and Matt Taylor (vocals, guitar). Taylor left the band in January 2006 and was replaced by Alex Valentine (bass, vocals) with Manzini switching to guitar. In September 2009, Alex Kew (vocals, guitar) made his debut with the band at London's 100 Club.

In July 2011, at the time of the release of EP2, they announced their break-up.

Band members
Alex Gold: vocals/guitar
Maz Manzini: vocals/guitar
Alex Kew: vocals/guitar
Alex Valentine: vocals/bass
Sam Hayward: drums
 Matt Taylor  (2005-January 2006)

Discography

Released songs
EP1 
"Stay Up Stay Up"
"Oh La La La"
"A Different Story"
"Whisper"
"Oh Roisin" (Awustic)

EP2 
"Sea Monkey"
"Members of the Freakshow"
"Waste My Days Away"
"Bless Your Bones"
"Gamla Stan"

External links

English rock music groups
People from High Wycombe